Patera clarki, the dwarf proud globe, is a species of land snail in the family Polygyridae. It is native to the southeastern United States, where it occurs in Georgia, North Carolina, South Carolina, and Tennessee. The subspecies nantahala is a federally listed threatened taxon endemic to Swain County, North Carolina.

Subspecies 
There are two subspecies:

 Patera clarki clarki (I.Lea, 1858) – dwarf proud globe
 Patera clarki nantahala (Clench & Banks, 1932) – noonday globe

References

Polygyridae
Fauna of the Southeastern United States
Gastropods described in 1858